Ned was a schooner launched in Maryland in 1812. She sailed as a letter of marque and took one prize in a single-ship action. The Royal Navy captured her in July 1813.

Career
Captain Joseph Dawson commissioned Ned as a letter of marque on 10 October 1812. He then sailed for France. After an action of 50 minutes Malvina struck. Captain Smith, of Malvina was killed; Ned had seven men wounded. Ned arrived back at Baltimore on 26 April 1813. Malvina reached Ocracoke, or Wilmington, North Carolina. 

Captain William Hackett commissioned Ned on 29 July 1813 at New York. He then sailed for France.

Fate
 captured Ned on 6/7 September 1813 off Arcasson after having chased her for four days. Captain James John Gordon Bremer described his prize as "a very fine copper-bottomed schooner, of two hundred and eighty tons, pierced for sixteen, and mounting six guns, and having forty-five men on board." On 21 September Lloyd's List reported that Ned, Hatchet, master, sailing from New York to Bordeaux, and prize to Royalist, had come into Plymouth. A second report stated that Ned had arrived at Plymouth on 19 September. She had originally left New York on 1 August to avoid an expected American Government embargo on US ports.

Notes, citations, and references
Notes

Citations

References
 
 

1812 ships
Ships built in the United States
Age of Sail merchant ships of the United States
Captured ships